The men's tournament of handball at the 2013 Mediterranean Games in Mersin, Turkey, were held between June 23 and June 30. All games were held at the Lütfullah Aksungur Sports Hall.

Format
TEn teams are divided into two preliminary groups. Each group have five teams.
The top 2 teams from each group will qualify for Semifinals, other teams will qualify for the placement matches.
Winners of the Semifinals contested the gold medal game and the losers the bronze medal game.

Participating teams

Group stage

Group A

Group B

Playoffs

Semifinals

9th/10th classification

7th/8th classification

5th/6th classification

Bronze medal match

Final

References

Men